Haddeland is a village in Hægebostad municipality in Agder county, Norway. Haddeland sits along the shores of the river Storåni, a northern branch of the river Lygna.

References

Villages in Agder
Hægebostad